A lost and found is a box or office present in many public areas where visitors can go to retrieve lost articles.

Lost and Found may also refer to:

Literature
 Lost and Found (book), a children's picture book by Oliver Jeffers, and a 2008 short film based on it
 Lost and Found (novel), a children's novel by Andrew Clements

Film

 Lost and Found (1979 film), a British comedy starring George Segal and Glenda Jackson
 Lost and Found: The Story of Cook's Anchor, a 1979 television documentary film by David Lean
 Lost and Found (1996 film), a Hong Kong film directed by Lee Chi-Ngai
 Lost & Found (1999 film), an American comedy starring David Spade and Sophie Marceau
 Lost and Found (2005 film), a Bosnia and Herzegovina film
 Lost and Found (2008 film), a Chinese black comedy directed by Ma Liwen
 Lost and Found (2016 Indian film), a Marathi-language film directed by Ruturaj Dhalgade
 Lost & Found (2016 American film), a mystery adventure film directed by Joseph Itaya
 Lost & Found, an Australian animated short film, winner of a 2018 AACTA Award
 Lost & Found (2022 film), a Spanish-Argentine-German thriller film directed by Jorge Dorado

Television
 Lost & Found Music Studios, a Canadian musical-drama children's series

Episodes
 "Lost & Found" (CSI: Crime Scene Investigation), 2010
 "Lost & Found" (Gilmore Girls), 2002
 "Lost and Found" (Haven), 2013
 "Lost and Found" (Melrose Place 1992)
 "Lost and Found" (Mysticons), 2017
 "Lost and Found" (NCIS), 2007
 "Lost and Found" (Pretty Little Liars: The Perfectionists), 2019
 "Lost and Found" (SpongeBob SquarePants), 2017
 "Lost and Found" (Star Trek: Prodigy), 2021
 "Lost and Found" (Supernatural), 2017
 "Lost and Found" (Touch), 2012
 "Lost and Found" (Transformers: Animated), 2008
 "Lost and Found" (The Twilight Zone), 1986

Music 
 Lost and Found, a 1960s band fronted by Eric Bloom of Blue Öyster Cult
 The Lost and Found Office, a 2011 musical by Jake Brunger and Pippa Cleary
 Lost & Found, a record label founded by Guy J

Albums 
 Lost & Found (America album), 2015
 Lost & Found (Australian Crawl album), 1996
 Lost and Found (Buena Vista Social Club album), 2015
 Lost and Found (Daniel Johnston album), 2006
 Lost and Found (David Byron album), 2003
 Lost and Found (The Detroit Cobras album), 2007
 Lost & Found (Ian Van Dahl album), 2004
 Lost & Found (Jason & the Scorchers album), 1985
 Lost & Found (Jonsi & Alex album), 2019
 Lost & Found (Jorja Smith album) or the title song, 2018
 Lost & Found (Ledisi album) or the title song, 2007
 Lost and Found (Martine McCutcheon album), 2017
 Lost & Found (Melissa Tkautz album), 2005
 Lost and Found (Mudvayne album), 2005
 Lost and Found (Ralph Towner album), 1995
 Lost & Found (Troy Cassar-Daley album), 2018
 Lost and Found (Will Smith album) or the title song, 2005
 Lost and Found (mixtape), by Tinchy Strider, 2006
 Lost & Found (soundtrack), 1999
 Lost & Found (1961–62), by the Beach Boys, 1991
 Lost and Found (Volume 2), by Ezio, 2006
 Lost & Found: Hip Hop Underground Soul Classics, by InI and Deda, 2003
 Lost and Found: Love Starved Heart, by Marvin Gaye, 1999
 Lost and Found: You've Got to Earn It (1962–1968), by the Temptations, 1999
 Lost N Found, by JJ Lin, 2011
 Losst and Founnd, by Harry Nilsson, 2019
 Lost & Found, by Green Velvet, 2009
 Lost & Found, by Jetboy, 1999
 Lost and Found, by RTZ, 2004
 Lost & Found (1986–1989), by the Kinks, 1991
 Lost and Found: Shadow the Hedgehog Vocal Trax, a Shadow the Hedgehog soundtrack, 2006

EPs 
 Lost & Found (Marilyn Manson EP), 2008
 Lost and Found (IU EP), 2008
 The Lost & Found, by Rasputina, 2001
 The Lost and Found EP, by Royal Wood, 2009
 Lost & Found, by Afrojack, 2009

Songs 
 "Lost and Found" (Brooks & Dunn song), 1991
 "Lost and Found" (Chris Brown song), 2017
 "Lost and Found" (Delerium song), 2007
 "Lost and Found" (Ellie Goulding song), 2015
 "Lost and Found" (Eye Cue song), 2018
 "Lost and Found" (Feeder song), 2006
 "Lost and Found" (The Kinks song), 1986
 "Lost & Found", by Amon Tobin from ISAM, 2011
 "Lost and Found", by Golden Earring from Cut, 1982
 "Lost and Found", by the Hives, a B-side of "Main Offender", 2001
 "Lost and Found", by the Radio Dept. from Lesser Matters, 2003
 "Lost and Found", by Senses Fail from Still Searching, 2006
 "Lost & Found", by Taken by Trees from Open Field, 2007
 "Lost and Found", by Train from A Girl, a Bottle, a Boat, 2017

See also 

 "...And Found", an episode of Lost
 "Lost//Found", by Eden from Vertigo, 2018
 Lost, Found, 2018 Chinese film
 
 
 Found and Lost (disambiguation)
 History's Lost & Found, an American television series
 Lost and Found and Lost, an album by The Seldon Plan, 2009
 Lost & Not Found, a song by Chase & Status, 2013
 Lost Property Office, a 2017 animation short film